Tim Sumner may refer to:

Tim Sumner (physicist), Professor of Experimental Physics at Imperial College London
Tim Sumner (footballer) (born 1994), Australian rules footballer